Farewell Amor is a 2020 American drama film written and directed by Ekwa Msangi. It premiered at the 2020 Sundance Film Festival. The film tells the story of a family of Angolan immigrants who reunite in the United States after a years-long separation, and is told from the perspective of the mother, father, and daughter.

Plot 
Walter came to the United States from Angola long ago in search of a better life. He has since settled in New York where he works as a cab driver. His wife Esther and daughter Sylvia are just now able to join him in the US after 17 years apart. Both Walter and Esther have found ways to cope with the time and distance apart—with Walter carrying on a new relationship, and Esther finding community in the church. Walter regretfully breaks up with his girlfriend Linda prior to his family’s arrival. In Brooklyn, the family of three must share a one-bedroom apartment. Esther finds herself struggling not only to adjust to a new country and culture, but also to a distant husband and a marriage that has seemingly lost its fire. The teenage Sylvia also struggles with homesickness, but pursues dance against the wishes of her mother.

Cast

Release
It was released on December 11, 2020 in the USA. It was released on December 18, 2020 on MUBI. It was screened at 51st International Film Festival of India in January 2021 in World Panorama section.

Home media 
On June 14, 2022, Farewell Amor was released on Blu-Ray and DVD by The Criterion Collection.

Reception
The website's critics consensus reads: "A striking debut feature for writer-director Ekwa Msangi, Farewell Amor movingly captures the fallout from a long-separated family's reunion." Metacritic reports a score of 75 out of 100 based on the opinions of 16 critics, indicating "generally favorable reviews".

Farewell Amor was praised for its acting and direction.  Writing for the Los Angeles Times, Kevin Crust wrote, "Though the film is shaped by big topics such as immigration, race, identity and religion, its power lies in its universality achieved through the small human details that tell its story of love and family. Its beauty lies in its empathy — something currently in short supply and therefore very welcome in the stories we consume."

References

External links

Farewell Amor: Coming Over an essay by Tiana Reid at the Criterion Collection

2020 drama films
American drama films
Films about families
Films about marriage
Films about immigration to the United States
Films set in Brooklyn
2020s English-language films
2020s American films
2020 independent films
English-language drama films